Boone Township is one of 12 townships in Harrison County, Indiana, United States. As of the 2010 census, its population was 1,391 and it contained 628 housing units.

History

Boone Township is named after Squire Boone who settled in the township in 1806. He died there in 1815 and is buried in the nearby Squire Boone Caverns. Boone built the first Baptist church in Indiana in the Boone Township in 1813. The church is called Old Goshen Church and has been reconstructed.

Kintner-Withers House was added to the National Register of Historic Places in 1980.

Geography
The streams of Big Run, Mays Branch and West Branch Mosquito Creek run through this township.

Cities and towns
 Laconia

Unincorporated towns
 Cedar Farm Landing
 Davidson
 Gurley Landing
 Rehoboth
 Tobacco Landing
(This list is based on USGS data and may include former settlements.)

Education
The children of Boone Township attend South Central school which is part of the South Harrison School District.

Adjacent townships
 Webster Township (north)
 Posey Township (northeast)
 Taylor Township (east)
 Heth Township (west)
 Harrison Township (northwest)

Cemeteries
The township contains 43 documented cemeteries:  Able, Barger, Becky Brown Family Plot, Beswick/Radmacher's, Brown Family Cemetery (aka Old Stephen's), Chaffin, Cole, Collen's Chapel, Cotner, Crosier, Dodd/Kings, Dunkard, Eckart, Ellis, Entrician/Endrocrane, Ferree/May, Grey, Guest, John Brown Cemetery, Kinzer/Lightner, Laconia Methodist (Bethel), Lane, Lewis, Madden, Marsh Burying Ground, McIntire (Evan's), Memorial Baptist/Presbyterian, Nancy Brown Plot, Old Goshen, Payton, Philip Rupp's Grave, Phillips Cemetery, Reed, Rehobeth, Ridley, Sacred Heart of Mary Catholic Cemetery, Sands, Stallings, Stephens, Union Chapel, unnamed Boone and Zimmerman family cemetery.

Major highways
 Indiana State Road 11
 Indiana State Road 337

References
 
 United States Census Bureau cartographic boundary files

External links
 Indiana Township Association
 United Township Association of Indiana

Townships in Harrison County, Indiana
Townships in Indiana